Toxicodendron striatum (syn. Rhus striata) is a South American poisonous tree in the family Anacardiaceae, commonly called manzanillo.  T. striatum grows in the tropical rain forests on low elevation slopes.

References

striatum
Trees of Peru